Mario de Luis Jiménez (born 5 June 2002) is a Spanish professional footballer who plays as a goalkeeper for Real Madrid Castilla.

Career

As a youth player, de Luis joined the youth academy of Real Madrid and played for their reserves. In 2022, he was sent on loan to Xerez Deportivo.

Career statistics

Club 
.

References

External links 

 Real Madrid profile
 
 
 

2002 births
Living people
Footballers from Madrid
Spanish footballers
Association football goalkeepers
Real Madrid Castilla footballers
Tercera División players
Primera Federación players
Spain youth international footballers